Mohand Chérif Hannachi (2 April 1950 – 13 November 2020) was an Algerian football player and chairman of Algerian club JS Kabylie. He was the team chairman since his election in 1993.

Hannachi died on 13 November 2020, in Algiers at the age of 70 from COVID-19.

Chairman Honours
 Won the African Cup Winners Cup once in 1995
 Won the CAF Cup three times in 2000, 2001 and 2002
 Won the Algerian league four times in 1995, 2004, 2006 and 2008
 Won the Algerian Cup two times in 1994 and 2011

References

1950 births
2020 deaths
Algerian footballers
Kabyle people
JS Kabylie players
Footballers from Tizi Ouzou
Algeria international footballers
Association footballers not categorized by position
21st-century Algerian people
Deaths from the COVID-19 pandemic in Algeria